Route 549, or Highway 549, may refer to:

Canada
Alberta Highway 549
Manitoba Provincial Road 549
 Ontario Highway 549

United Kingdom
 A549 road
London Buses route 549

United States 
 
 
 
 
 
 
 
 Texas:
 
 
Territories
  Puerto Rico Highway 549